FC Nookat is a Kyrgyzstani football club based in Nookat that plays in the top division in Kyrgyzstan, the Kyrgyzstan League.

History 
19??: Founded as FC Nookat.

Achievements
Kyrgyzstan League:
7th place, Zone B: 1998

Current squad

Football clubs in Kyrgyzstan